The 2014 Boston Lobsters season was the tenth season of the franchise (in its current incarnation) in World TeamTennis (WTT).

The Lobsters had 1 win and 13 losses and finished last in the Eastern Conference. They did not qualify for the playoffs.

Season recap

Greene hired as coach
On January 9, 2014, the Lobsters announced that Robert Greene had been hired as the team's new head coach replacing Bud Schultz. Greene was formerly chairman of the United States Tennis Association Olympic Tennis Committee and responsible for the 2008 United States Olympic Tennis Team. Schultz had been the Lobsters head coach since the 2009 season.

James Blake trades
The Lobsters apparently acquired James Blake who played for the New York Sportimes in 2013, in a trade not revealed to the public until February 11, 2014, when Boston traded Blake to the Springfield Lasers for undisclosed consideration. Blake was not drafted in 2013, and played one match for the Sportimes as a wildcard player. However, John McEnroe appeared for the Sportimes later in the season as a wildcard player as well. Since WTT teams can have only one wildcard player of each gender, the designation of McEnroe as a wildcard player by the Sportimes resulted in their effective release of Blake. With Blake registering for the 2014 marquee player draft, under WTT rules the right to protect him would have reverted to the Philadelphia Freedoms who drafted him as a marquee player in 2012. Therefore, the apparent unreported trade took place between the Lobsters and the Freedoms between the end of the 2012 season and the 2014 marquee player draft.

Marquee player draft
Since the Lobsters had the worse record of the two conference championship match losers in 2013 at 5 wins and 9 losses, they had the fourth-to-last (fifth) selection in each round of the WTT Marquee Player Draft. The Lobsters passed on making any selections at the marquee player draft.

Isner returns to Lobsters
On March 4, 2014, the Lobsters re-signed John Isner, the top-ranked American male player at the time, as a wildcard player. Isner had previously played for the Lobsters from 2010 to 2012. Upon announcement of the signing, Isner said, "I'm excited to return to play for the Boston Lobsters. I love being part of a team and I'm looking forward to playing in front of the great Lobsters fans."

Roster player draft
After the contraction of the Las Vegas Neon, the Lobsters moved up to the fourth selection in each round of the Roster Player Draft. The Lobsters protected Eric Butorac and drafted Sharon Fichman, Megan Moulton-Levy and 2005 WTT Male Rookie of the Year and 2007 WTT Championship Most Valuable Player Rik de Voest in the WTT Roster Player Draft. De Voest had been left unprotected by the Springfield Lasers.

Other free agent player signings
On July 7, 2014, the Lobsters signed Caitlin Whoriskey as a substitute player.

On July 12, 2014, the Lobsters re-signed Coco Vandeweghe as a substitute player. She had previously played for the team in 2010 and 2011.

On July 18, 2014, the Lobsters signed Scott Lipsky as a substitute player.

On July 21, 2014, the Lobsters signed James Cerretani as a substitute player.

On July 22, 2014, the Lobsters signed Julia Cohen as a substitute player.

Struggles on the court
The Lobsters struggled throughout the entire season. They lost all five sets in five of their matches and also failed to win at least 10 games five times.

After starting the season with six straight losses, the Lobsters broke through for their only win of the season on July 15, 2014, at home against the Austin Aces. Boston raced out to a 10–0 lead by sweeping all five games in each of the first two sets. Rik de Voest opened the match with a set win in men's singles. Sharon Fichman and Megan Moulton-Levy followed by taking the women's doubles. The Aces responded with a furious comeback attempt winning the next three sets to send the match to overtime with he Lobsters leading, 19–15. After dropping the first three games of overtime, Moulton-Levy and de Voest were one game away from facing a super tiebreaker when they won the fourth game to seal a 20–18 victory. The pair of 5–0 set wins to open the match were the only two sets in which the Lobsters blanked their opponent during the entire season.

The Lobsters ended the season with a seven-match losing streak and a 16-set losing streak. They finished with 1 win and 13 losses, the worst record in WTT. The Lobsters were the only team in the league that failed to win at least 200 games and the only WTT team to lose at least 300 games. Every other team in the league won at least six matches.

Event chronology
 January 9, 2014: The Lobsters announced that Robert Greene had been hired as the team's new head coach replacing Bud Schultz.
 February 11, 2014: The Lobsters traded James Blake, whom had earlier been acquired from the Philadelphia Freedoms in an unannounced transaction, to the Springfield Lasers for undisclosed consideration.
 March 4, 2014: The Lobsters re-signed free agent John Isner as a wildcard player.
 March 11, 2014: The Lobsters protected Eric Butorac and drafted Sharon Fichman, Megan Moulton-Levy and Rik de Voest in the WTT Roster Player Draft.
 July 7, 2014: The Lobsters signed Caitlin Whoriskey as a substitute player.
 July 12, 2014: The Lobsters re-signed Coco Vandeweghe as a substitute player.
 July 18, 2014: The Lobsters signed Scott Lipsky as a substitute player.
 July 19, 2014: With a record of 1 win and 9 losses, the Lobsters were eliminated from playoff contention when they lost to the Washington Kastles, 23–9.
 July 21, 2014: The Lobsters signed James Cerretani as a substitute player.
 July 22, 2014: The Lobsters signed Julia Cohen as a substitute player.

Draft picks
Since the Lobsters had the worse record of the two conference championship match losers in 2013, they had the fourth-to-last (fifth) selection in each round of the WTT Marquee Player Draft and moved up to fourth in the Roster Player Draft after WTT contracted the Las Vegas Neon.

Marquee player draft
The Wild passed on making any selections at the WTT Marquee Player Draft.

Roster player draft
The Lobsters protected Eric Butorac and drafted Sharon Fichman, Megan Moulton-Levy and Rik de Voest in the WTT Roster Player Draft. The selections made by the Lobsters are shown in the table below.

Match log

{| align="center" border="1" cellpadding="2" cellspacing="1" style="border:1px solid #aaa"
|-
! colspan="2" style="background:#C80815; color:white" | Legend
|-
! bgcolor="ccffcc" | Lobsters Win
! bgcolor="ffbbbb" | Lobsters Loss
|-
! colspan="2" | Home team in CAPS
|}

Team personnel
Reference:

On-court personnel
  Robert Greene – Head Coach
  Eric Butorac
  James Cerretani
  Julia Cohen
  Rik de Voest
  Sharon Fichman
  John Isner
  Scott Lipsky
  Megan Moulton-Levy
  Coco Vandeweghe
  Caitlin Whoriskey

Front office
 Bahar Uttam – Owner and CEO
 Darlene Hayes – General Manager

Notes:

Statistics
Players are listed in order of their game-winning percentage provided they played in at least 40% of the Lobsters' games in that event, which is the WTT minimum for qualification for league leaders in individual statistical categories.

Men's singles

Women's singles

Men's doubles

Women's doubles

Mixed doubles

Team totals

Transactions
 January 9, 2014: The Lobsters hired Robert Greene as the team's new head coach replacing Bud Schultz.
 February 11, 2014: The Lobsters traded James Blake, whom had earlier been acquired from the Philadelphia Freedoms in an unannounced transaction, to the Springfield Lasers for undisclosed consideration.
 February 11, 2014: The Lobsters left Mark Philippoussis unprotected in the WTT Marquee Player Draft effectively making him a free agent.
 March 4, 2014: The Lobsters re-signed John Isner as a wildcard player.
 March 11, 2014: The Lobsters protected Eric Butorac and drafted Sharon Fichman, Megan Moulton-Levy and Rik de Voest in the WTT Roster Player Draft.
 March 11, 2014: The Lobsters left Jill Craybas, Amir Weintraub, Paola Suárez and Katalin Marosi unprotected in the WTT Roster Player Draft effectively making them all free agents. The Lobsters had traded up (for financial consideration) in the 2013 draft to select Suárez. However, she suffered an injury before the start of the 2013 season and never played for the team.
 July 7, 2014: The Lobsters signed Caitlin Whoriskey as a substitute player.
 July 12, 2014: The Lobsters re-signed Coco Vandeweghe as a substitute player.
 July 18, 2014: The Lobsters signed Scott Lipsky as a substitute player.
 July 21, 2014: The Lobsters signed James Cerretani as a substitute player.
 July 22, 2014: The Lobsters signed Julia Cohen as a substitute player.

Charitable support
During each night of the 2014 season, the WTT team with the most aces received US$1,000 toward a local charity of the team's choice as part of a program called Mylan Aces. In the case of a tie, the award was split accordingly. The Lobsters earned $500 for Education Outbound through the program.

See also

References

External links
Boston Lobsters official website
World TeamTennis official website

Boston Lobsters season
Boston Lobsters 2014
Boston Lobsters 2014
Boston Lobsters season